Seminyak is a mixed tourist residential area on the west coast of Bali in Indonesia, just north of Kuta and Legian.

Originally a separate township, this is now another suburb of Kuta. This area is very popular with resident expatriates; land and accommodation prices are amongst the highest in Bali. Plenty of luxury spas and hotels abound. Owing to its high density of high-end shopping, combined with the clustering of many fine eating establishments, it has rapidly become one of the most well-known tourist areas on the island.

In addition to a few commercial strips with popular and lively restaurants, bars, villas, and good crafts/furniture shops, there are a few notable establishments: Ku Dé Ta, which is a bar/restaurant with a cult following based on its beach side/semi-resort atmosphere that has earned it the title of number one party spot in various magazines, and Oberoi, which is an expensive hotel with a worldwide reputation.
Jalan Raya Seminyak (more often referred to as Jalan Legian), runs parallel with the beach, bisecting the district and acts as its main road artery.

See also 

Seminyak Villas
Jalan Legian
List of beaches in Indonesia

References

External links 

 A Bali Beach Worth a Stay - NY Times Article on Seminyak - Feb 22, 2004
 

Beaches of Bali
Populated places in Bali
Shopping districts and streets in Indonesia
Badung Regency